Jimmy Nolen (April 3, 1934 – December 18, 1983) was an American guitarist, known for his distinctive "chicken scratch" lead guitar playing in James Brown's bands. In its survey of "The 100 Greatest Guitarists of All Time," the English magazine Mojo ranks Nolen number twelve.

Career

Early life and career
Born in Oklahoma City, Oklahoma, United States, Nolen took up the guitar at the age of 14, teaching himself on a Harmony Acoustic guitar. Having played the violin since the age of nine, Nolen already had a sound musical foundation upon which to base his T-Bone Walker-inspired guitar playing. Nolen was "discovered" in a club in Tulsa, Oklahoma by Jimmy Wilson, a blues singer famous for his 1953 hit "Tin Pan Alley." Soon afterward, Wilson offered Nolen a job in his band. He took Nolen back to Los Angeles, California, to play in a studio band with popular southern California players Monte Easter (trumpet) and Chuck Higgins (tenor saxophone). During this period Nolen recorded his own commercially unsuccessful singles, mostly for King Records' Federal subsidiary, on which he both sang and played period-inspired blues songs.

In 1957, Nolen began to play for Johnny Otis, replacing the ailing Pete "Guitar" Lewis. He was the principal behind Otis' hit "Willie and the Hand Jive." He remained in Otis’ band until 1959 when he formed his own group, The Jimmy Nolen Band. They performed in small clubs and ballrooms in California and Arizona's "Chitlin' Circuit", backing many of the blues musicians that passed through California. The principal influences that inspired his guitar technique were, T-Bone Walker, B.B. King and Lowell Fulson. The Jimmy Nolen band was popular but never released any records since their primary purpose was to work as live backup for more famous acts. In the early 1960s Nolen began playing with the backing band for harmonica player George "Harmonica" Smith.

James Brown (1965-1970, 1972-1983)
In 1965, Nolen joined the James Brown band at the recommendation of Les Buie, Brown's guitar player at that time. Buie had grown tired of the road and recommended Nolen as a replacement when the band was in Los Angeles. Like saxophone player Maceo Parker, trombonist Fred Wesley and drummers Clyde Stubblefield and John "Jabo" Starks, Nolen was a staple in James Brown's band.

The J.B.'s/Maceo and All the King's Men era (1970-1972)
During this time Nolen began to tour with Maceo Parker's group Maceo & All the King's Men. James replied to the mass resignation of his musicians by hiring a then-juvenile band called the Pacemakers from Cincinnati, Ohio. This band was composed of the young Bootsy Collins on bass, his brother Catfish Collins on guitar, Robert McCullough on saxophone, Clayton Gunnels on trumpet, and Frank Waddy on drums. The new band was named The J.B.'s and marked a new era for James Brown. Months after this new band was formed Starks and Stubblefield returned. Despite this band's undeniable talent for playing breakneck funk, it was relatively short-lived as a group, as the Collins brothers soon left to join George Clinton's Parliament-Funkadelic organization. In 1972, Nolen returned to play with The J.B.'s.

Death
Nolen remained with Brown until December 18, 1983, when he died of a heart attack in Atlanta, Georgia.

"Chicken scratch" sound

Nolen developed a style of picking known as "chicken scratch," in which the guitar strings are pressed lightly against the fingerboard and then quickly released just enough to get a muted “scratching” sound that is produced by rapid rhythmic strumming of the opposite hand near the bridge. This new guitar style was affected not only by Nolen's choice of two and three note chord voicings of augmented 7th and 9th chords, but also by his strumming straight 16th note patterns, as in James Brown's "Papa's Got a Brand New Bag."  Nolen's choices of guitars and amplifiers also affected the sound for which he would be nicknamed.

In his first recordings with James Brown, Nolen used a Gibson ES-175 and an ES-5 switchmaster, both hollow-body jazz guitars equipped with single coil P-90s. He also relied on a Gibson Les Paul Recording model with single coil pickups, an Acoustic Black Widow, and a Fresher Straighter, which were also single coil instruments. The single coil pickups on these guitars produced a thin "chanky" sound; Nolen ran these guitars through a Fender Twin Reverb with the treble set at 8 out of 10. The result was a rhythm guitar sound that seemed to float somewhere between the low-end thump of the electric bass and the cutting tone of the snare and hi-hats, with a rhythmically melodic feel that fell deep in the pocket. A good example of such tone would be in James Brown's "I Got You (I Feel Good)" and "I've Got The Feeling." Nolen had been experimenting with the sound prior to his joining James Brown: it can be heard on the Johnny Otis song "Willie and the Hand Jive" (1958) and an obscure 45 RPM single called "Swinging Peter Gunn Theme (Parts 1&2), released in 1960 on the Fidelity label, a subsidiary of Art Rupe's Specialty Records.

Hip hop legacy

Despite the fact that Nolen defined the guitar style which influenced decades of guitarists and funk groups to follow, including Earth Wind and Fire, Tower of Power, Chic, George Clinton, and more, his influence on other forms of contemporary popular music such as hip hop is often overlooked. James Brown cuts such as "Papas Got a Brand New Bag," "I Got You (I Feel Good)," "It's a Man's Man's Man's World," "Cold Sweat," "Bring it Up (Hipster’s Avenue)," "Ain’t it Funky," "Funky Drummer," and "The Boss" have been sampled, mimicked and otherwise utilized by countless producers, DJs, and MCs. Eric B., the producer/DJ associated with Rakim Allah's early recordings, was known for his use of James Brown samples, most of which featured Nolen, "Jabo" Starks and/or Clyde Stubblefield. A good example of this would be “Move the Crowd”, in which Eric B. sampled Brown's 1969 recording "Say It Loud - I'm Black and I'm Proud" featuring the aforementioned lineup, or the 1973 "Blind Man Can See it" for Eric B. & Rakim’s "?." The Bomb Squad, Public Enemy’s production group, is another name on the lengthy list of producers that have relied heavily on James Brown grooves assisted by Nolen’s “chicken scratch” style: Brown's 1973 "Make it Good to Yourself" was the part of the foundation on which Public Enemy laid their cut "1 Million Bottlebags."

References

Bibliography
Kienzle, Rich. Great Guitarists. New York: Facts on File, 1986. p. 234. 
Thompson, Dave. Funk. Detroit: Backbeat Books, 2001. pp. 11–14. 

1934 births
1983 deaths
Musicians from Oklahoma City
African-American guitarists
American blues guitarists
American funk guitarists
American soul guitarists
American male guitarists
James Brown Orchestra members
The J.B.'s members
20th-century American musicians
Guitarists from Oklahoma
20th-century American guitarists
American rhythm and blues guitarists
Lead guitarists
20th-century American male musicians